Chrysoglossa demades is a moth of the family Notodontidae first described by Herbert Druce in 1885. It is found in Panama, Costa Rica, Nicaragua and Mexico.

The larvae possibly feed on Quercus (oak) species.

References

Moths described in 1885
Notodontidae